The 2012–13 Georgia Tech Yellow Jackets men's basketball team represented the Georgia Institute of Technology during the 2012–13 NCAA Division I men's basketball season. The Yellow Jackets, led by second-year head coach Brian Gregory, were members of the Atlantic Coast Conference. The Yellow Jackets played their home games at the newly remodeled and renamed McCamish Pavilion. They finished the season 16–15, 6–12 in ACC play to finish in a tie for ninth place. They lost in the first round of the ACC tournament to Boston College.

Departures

Roster

Schedule

|-
!colspan=9| Regular season

|-
!colspan=9| ACC men's basketball tournament

References

Georgia Tech Yellow Jackets men's basketball seasons
Georgia Tech
Georgia Tech
Georgia Tech